Field Roast was founded in Seattle, WA in 1997 by brothers Richard and David Lee. The company quickly partnered with Wild Oats and Whole Foods.

Field Roast Sausages are made the same way as a traditional meat-based sausage by sing traditional techniques. Field Roasts starts by grinding the grains ("the meat") with the fresh vegetables. After this processes they add in the flavors, spices and other additives.

History 
The company started in 1997 by brothers Richard and David Lee in Seattle, WA as a vegan "meat" loaf company.

2005 won awards from PETA

2011 the Frankfurter makes a debut at the Mariners Stadium

2013 the first Field Burger hits the stadiums for the San Francisco Giants and the Cleveland Indians

2015 Field Roast announces the new Chao Creamery, vegan and dairy-free cheese slices. Field Roast wins VegNews Company of the Year Award.

2017 Field Roast came out with their first cookbook

2018 Field Roast joins the Greenleaf Foods Family

2020 Field Roast launches five new vegan cheeses under the name, Chao Creamery, to be sold at retailers nationwide. The product will be produced in blocks, shreds, and all new flavors.

In June 2021, Field Roast announced a partnership with the Los Angeles Dodges to feature their new Stadium Dog. This would be the first plant-based "hot dog" to come to Dodger Stadium. The Stadium Dogs will be sold in grocery stores along side their other plant-based sausages.

In January 2023, Chao Creamery was voted best Dairy-Free Cheese by VegNews

Ingredients 
Sausages: Made from wheat gluten (seitan), yeast extract, malt, barley, natural hickory smoke flavor, safflower oil Yukon gold potatoes, onions, garlic, sage, and dried apples.

Cheeses: Filtered water, coconut oil,modified corn and potato starch, potato starch, fermented chao tofu (soybeans, water, salt,sesame oil, calcium sulfate), sea salt, natural flavor, olive extract (antioxidant used as a preservative) and beta carotene color.

Variations 

 Vegan Smoked Apple Sage
 Vegan Italian Garlic & Fennel Sausage
 Vegan Italian Sausage
 Plant-Based Apple Maple Breakfast 
 Plant-Based Signature Stadium Hot Dogs
 Vegetarian Frankfurters
 Field Roast Burger
 Vegan Chipotle Sausage
Vegan Spicy Mexican Chipotle Sausage
Vegan Sage & Garlic Plant-Based Celebration Roast
Chao Creamy Chao Slices
Chao Original Shreds
Chao Mexican Medley Chao Shreds
Chao Slices Tomato Cayenne
Classic Pizzeria Plant Based Pepperoni Slices "Planteroni"
Plant-Based Chicken Nuggets

References

External links 

 Field Roast Webside
 Where to buy

Food manufacturers of the United States
Meat substitutes